The 1979–80 Cupa României was the 42nd edition annual knockout tournament of Cupa României. The title was won by Politehnica Timişoara who defeated Steaua București by 2-1. 30 teams participated and 30 matches were played.

Format
The competition is an annual knockout tournament.

First round proper matches are played on the ground of the lowest ranked team, then from the second round proper the matches are played on a neutral location.

In the first round proper, if a match is drawn after 90 minutes, the game goes in extra time, if the scored is still tight after 120 minutes, the team who played away will qualify, if the teams are from the same league, then the winner will be established at penalty kicks.

From the second round proper, if a match is drawn after 90 minutes, the game goes in extra time, if the scored is still tight after 120 minutes, then the winner will be established at penalty kicks.

From the first edition, the teams from Divizia A entered in competition in sixteen finals, rule which remained till today.

First round proper

|colspan=3 style="background-color:#FFCCCC;"|9 December 1979

|-
|colspan=3 style="background-color:#FFCCCC;"|20 February 1980

Second round proper

|colspan=3 style="background-color:#FFCCCC;"|24 February 1980

Quarter-finals

|colspan=3 style="background-color:#FFCCCC;"|16 April 1980

Semi-finals

|colspan=3 style="background-color:#FFCCCC;"|28 May 1980

Final

References

External links
 romaniansoccer.ro
 Official site
 The Romanian Cup on the FRF's official site

Cupa României seasons
1979–80 in Romanian football
Romania